Government Medical College, Kottayam is a government medical college in Kerala, India.

History
The college started functioning in December 1962 as the third government-run medical college in Kerala. The college which initially functioned in the District Hospital, Kottayam from 1962 to 1970 was shifted to Arpookara in April 1970.

In 1975, all clinical departments were shifted to the newly constructed campus at Arpookara, now named Gandhinagar. The same year, the nearby ESI Hospital was taken over to start the children's hospital: Institute of Child Health. A new administrative B block was started in 1985. In 1996, the C block was added which houses the departments of Pharmacology, Pathology, Microbiology and the Central Library.

Events
1960: The project for establishing a medical college at Kottayam was included in the third five-year plan.
1961: First batch (1961 batch) of 50 MBBS students were selected and accommodated at Government Medical College, Thiruvananthapuram from 8 January 1961.
1962: Site for the campus was identified and land acquisition begins. This area was the confluence of three panchayaths — Kumaranalloor, Athirampuzha and Arpookara — and formed part of the territorial limits of three villages: Perumbaikkad, Athirampuzha and Kaipuzha. Dr C M Francis was appointed as principal and special officer of the college. He took over on 5 July 1962 with the college functioning from Kottayam town. Semi-permanent buildings were constructed to house the college and two hostels (one for 100 male and the other for 50 female students). The Inspection Commission of Kerala University visited the college on 10 July 1962 for assessing the facilities; affiliation was granted on the basis of the commission's report.
1962: Admission (II batch, 50 students) accommodated at Thiruvananthapuram joined the Arpookara Campus on 12 March 1962 after spending September to November at Thiruvananthapuram. The medical college was formally inaugurated on 3 December 1962 by R Sankar, the chief minister of Kerala in the presence of M P Govindan Nair, the health minister. Campus on the day of inauguration consisted of the semi-permanent buildings to house pre-clinical and para-clinical departments, library, animal house, store, women's hostel (now the Dental College) and men's hostel (now MHSQ) besides the PWD office and seven acquired buildings.
1963–1961 admission (I batch, 50 students) joined the campus on 06.01.1963 after first MBBS at Thiruvananthapuram.
1964: The District Hospital at Kottayam was brought under the college and used as teaching hospital (MCH Kottayam) from January 1963 onwards; a 100 bedded block for medicine and surgery and another 116-bedded block for Obstetrics & Gynaecology and Paediatrics were constructed in the District Hospital complex in 1963 and 1964. III batch (1963) with increased strength of 60 students was admitted at Medical College Kottayam itself on 01.08.1963. Construction of permanent buildings for hostels for men and women, quarters, etc. were undertaken from 1963. Annual intake was increased to 80 from 1964 batch. A space of  around the campus was declared as a Controlled Area and "Kottayam Medical College Area Development Authority" was constituted to ensure proper development
1965: The MC Health Centre at Ettumanoor was established in 1965 after taking over the Government Dispensary.
1969: Construction of E, F and G blocks and Kitchen block of MCH at Arpookara was completed.
1970: Construction of the present outpatient (OP) block and laundry of MCH at Arpookara completed. Medical College Hospital at Arpookara was formally inaugurated by the minister for health KM George on 14.04.1970. Departments of Medicine and Surgery were shifted from DH Kottayam to MCH Arpookara. Other departments continued to function at DH Kottayam (MCH Kottayam). The campus in 1970 consisted of the semi-permanent buildings to house pre- and para-clinical departments, library, animal house, college office and central workshop (earlier women's hostel and now part of DCK), pharmacy, MCH EFG block, laundry, kitchen block, women's hostel (now MHSQ), men's hostel, PHED, PWD office and store, quarters type A: 01-10, B: 01-13, C: 01-17, D: 01-05, E: 01-16, F: 01-16, G: 01-34, and seven acquired buildings.
1973: Post graduate courses (MS Surgery & MD Medicine) started from 1973/74 (1 June 1973).
1974: Construction of A, B and C blocks of MCH at Arpookara was completed; other major departments were shifted from DH Kottayam to MCH Gandhinagar in 1974 and 75. The area surrounding the campus and the surrounding localities was christened Gandhinagar.
1975: ESI hospital with its quarters and campus was bought from ESI Corporation and converted to Institute of Child Health in April 1975, shifting the Paediatrics department from DH Kottayam.
1977: Strength of admission increased from 80 to 85 during 1977-78; Bed strength stood at 837.
1979: Annual intake of MBBS increased to 100 from 1979/80 academic year.
1980: Affiliation was shifted to Gandhiji University (later renamed Mahatma Gandhi University) following the bifurcating of  Kerala University.
1982: College of Nursing, Kottayam started functioning from May 1982 with 25 BSc (Nursing) students. Due to lack of facilities at Kottayam, it was initially accommodated at the College of Nursing Thiruvananthapuram.
1985: The new Medical College administrative block was opened in October. The College of Nursing was shifted to Gandhinagar in November and starts functioning from the space vacated by college office (the present Dental College).
1994: The Departments of Pathology, Microbiology, Pharmacology and Central Library shifted to the new C block.
2001: Dental College started functioning in the campus.
2003–4: Major construction started.
 Construction of phase 1 of cardiology – cardiothoracic block
 Construction of the (C2 block) intended for housing the remaining departments: Anatomy, Physiology, Biochemistry and Community Medicine, which are still functioning in the temporary buildings put up in 1962
 300-bed hostel for nursing students
 Obstetrics & Gynaecology block, Phase I
2004: Inauguration of Dental College building
2005: Inauguration of learning resource centre in January. Inauguration of Vali's children's cancer care center (Leukemia ward) in ICH October. Telemedicine project started functioning.
2008: Inauguration of C2 block and Anatomy, Physiology, Biochemistry and Community Medicine departments were shifted to the new block.
2018: Inauguration of new casualty block by chief minister of Kerala Mr Pinarayi Vijayan.

Attached institutions
The collegiate institutions attached to Medical College Kottayam are Medical College Hospital (MCH), Institute of Child Health (ICH),Kottayam Medical College Health Center (KMCHC).

'Gandhinagar' from 1974. Construction of ABC and EFG blocks of MCH were completed during 1969 and 1970 respectively.

Institute of Child Health (ICH)
The Institute of Child Health is at about 1.5 km from the main medical college hospital campus. It was established in 1975. It houses the departments of pediatrics and pediatric surgery.  It imparts curative and preventive health for children from all districts of central Kerala: Kottayam, Idukki, Pathanamthitta, Alapuzha and Ernakulam.  The average daily outpatients being treated in this institution is 500. About 9,750 children are treated as inpatients annually in various specialties.

Leukemia ward (Walli's children cancer care centre): A newly constructed leukemia ward was commissioned on 29.10.2005 attached to the Institute of Child Health as a sponsored programme.

ICH family welfare centre, medical records library and incinerator room are attached to the Institute of Child Health.

Departments

 Anaesthesiology
 Anatomy
 Biochemistry
 Cardiology
 Cardiothoracic and Vascular Surgery
 Community Medicine
 Dermatology & Venereology
 E N T
 Endocrinology
 Forensic Medicine
 Gastroenterology (Monday & Wednesday )
 General Surgery
 Internal Medicine
 Microbiology
 Nephrology
 Neurosurgery
 Obstetrics & Gynaecology
 Ophthalmology
 Orthopaedics
 Oral and Maxillofacial Surgery
 Paediatric Surgery
 Pathology
 Pediatrics
 Pharmaceutical Science
 Pharmacology
 Physical Education
 Physical medicine & Rehabilitation
 Physiology
 Plastic Surgery
 Psychiatry 
 Pulmonary Medicine
 Radiodiagnosis and Interventional Radiology
 Radiotherapy
 T B and Chest Diseases
 Transfusion Medicine & Immunohaematology
 Urology
Infectious disease unit

Facilities
Through over 36 years the campus has grown into a small township with in house banking facilities, co-operative stores, Post Office, canteens, hotels, lodging facilities as well as subsidized hostels and accommodations for the faculty.

The bed strength of the Medical College Hospital alone is 1401, although the hospital frequently operates at 140%–150% capacity.  The present facilities include: round the clock casualty service, Blood Bank facility, modern lab and imaging services, colour doppler, TMT, Holter monitor, haemodialysis, endoscopic & laparoscopic procedures, open heart surgery, specialised pain clinic under anaesthesiology, computerised pulmonary function lab under the Chest & TB dept, cardiac rehabilitation centre under Cardiology dept, specialised trauma care centre, advanced intensive care units for Surgery, Medicine, Cardiac services, Neuro-surgery & Plastic Surgery..

The House Surgeoncy Program has been acknowledged as a rigorous one with multiple training opportunities not readily available in some other teaching institutions — ensuring that graduates are well prepared for higher training.  In fact, a majority of graduates go on to pursue PG courses, very commendable given the very few seats available for such higher training in the country.

Administration
College of Nursing, Kottayam is a full-pledged institution under the director of Medical Education.  The professor and head (director) is the administrative head of College of Nursing who is responsible to the DME through principal Medical College, Kottayam.  The administration and internal management of the college is vested with the professor and head.

Medical College Hospital is a multi-bed hospital with 450 doctors and about 2,000 staff members.
List of former principals.

Courses offered
Main courses offered include MBBS, post-graduate training in basic specialties (M.D., MS and diploma courses) and super-specialties (DM and MCh), BDS, BSc Nursing and other paramedical courses.

Every year, 175 students get admitted for MBBS course through central government's NEET UG Examination.

There will be democratic electionsa'.

Other courses
 Four years of BSc Nursing course with 12 months internship
 Three years Diploma in General Nursing and Midwifery
 MSc Nursing course started from 2004
 Medical Surgical Nursing
 Psychiatric Nursing
Allied health courses - Radiological Technology, Medical Laboratory Technology, Ophthalmic Technology, Pharmacy course etc.

Connections
Government Medical College, Kottayam is well connected by road and rail.
Main Central Road MC Road connects the medical college from Samkranthi which is 2 km away. Ettumanoor is situated 7 km away from the college.

Kottayam, Kumaranalloor and Ettumanoor are the nearest railway stations.

References

External links

 Official website
 Alumni Association

Medical colleges in Kerala
Universities and colleges in Kottayam
Kottayam
Educational institutions established in 1962
1962 establishments in Kerala